General elections are expected to be held in Eswatini in 2023.

Electoral system
The House of Assembly consists of 59 elected seats and up to ten chosen by the Ngwenyama. The 59 elected members are elected in a two-round system. A primary election is held in each of the 385 chiefdoms to choose a candidate for the secondary election, with between three and twenty candidates in each chiefdom. In the secondary election, the country is divided into 59 constituencies (increased from 55 in the 2013 elections); each winner of the primary election then stands in the constituency that covers their chiefdom. Both rounds operate on a first-past-the-post basis, with all candidates running as independents.

References

Elections in Eswatini
General
Eswatini